Oliverea is a populated place in Ulster County, New York, United States. It is situated on Esopus Creek along Ulster Country Route 47 within Catskill State Park.

References

Hamlets in Ulster County, New York